Alore is a village in the Chiplun taluka of Ratnagiri district, Maharashtra, India.

Alore pin code is 415603 and postal head office is Alore .

Kolkewadi ( 2 km ), Pedhambe ( 3 km ), Adare ( 6 km ), Gane ( 6 km ), Kanhe ( 7 km ) are the nearby villages to Alore. Alore is surrounded by Khed Taluka towards north, Patan Taluka towards east, Sangmeshwar Taluka towards south, Guhagar Taluka towards west .

Chiplun, Satara, Mahabaleswar, Karad are the nearby cities to Alore.

Language
Marathi is the most common language spoken here.

See also

 Konkan
 Konkan division
 Vashishti River
 Western Ghats

References

Villages in Ratnagiri district